Moustapha M'Baye (born 22 January 1992) is a Polish volleyball player. At the professional club level, he plays for Jastrzębski Węgiel.

Honours

Clubs
 National championships
 2014/2015  Polish Cup, with Lotos Trefl Gdańsk
 2014/2015  Polish Championship, with Lotos Trefl Gdańsk

References

External links
 
 Player profile at PlusLiga.pl  
 Player profile at Volleybox.net

1992 births
Living people
Sportspeople from Gdańsk
Polish men's volleyball players
Trefl Gdańsk players
AZS Częstochowa players
Stal Nysa players
Cuprum Lubin players
Jastrzębski Węgiel players
Middle blockers